Ingrid Schulerud (born 8 July 1959) is a Norwegian diplomat.

She served as Norway's ambassador to Belgium from 2015 to 2019.

Personal life

Early life
Schulerud is the daughter of Mentz Schulerud, an author and radio personality well known for his encyclopedic knowledge of their home city of Oslo. Her aunt—Mentz' sister—was the children's book author Anne-Cath. Vestly.

Education
Schulerud attended Oslo Cathedral School, where she met Jens when they were both 17 years old. Here, she defeated her future husband in the election for Representative to the National Students’ Union, running for the Socialist Left Party.

Family life
Schulerud is married to Jens Stoltenberg, the Secretary General of NATO, and the former Norwegian Prime Minister.  Being the spouse of the Norwegian Prime Minister during two different periods of time, (2000–2001 and 2005–2013), she has chosen a somewhat withdrawn social position. During the first period she did not accompany her husband on any official state visits for over a year, until they visited India together in April 2001. In general though, she has chosen to stay out of the media's scrutiny primarily to shield her children. The couple have a son and a daughter.

Career
After travels in Latin America, Schulerud wanted to work for developmental organisations; however, she was engaged by the Ministry of International Development to study the environmental impact of World Bank projects. This led her to break off her ongoing master's degree, and undergo the basic training for the Ministry of Foreign Affairs, that she finished in 1988.

In 1990, while she was stationed at the Norwegian embassy in Budapest, Hungary, her husband was appointed State Secretary in the Ministry of the Environment, and this caused her return home to Norway. Subsequently, she has held different positions in the Ministry, mostly with matters relating to the Baltic countries and Central Europe.

She was the Deputy Director General for Central Europe and EEA-financing in the Ministry of Foreign Affairs in Norway until becoming the Norwegian Ambassador to Belgium in April 2015.

She has been active in the Norwegian Civil Service Union, and has attended the Norwegian National Defence College; an institution for education on military and strategic matters for both military personnel and civilians.

References

External links
 Article from VG, on job appointment
 Article in Dagbladet on Indian visit
 Interview in Dagbladet
 Interview in Aftenposten
 Profile in Aftenposten

Living people
1959 births
Diplomats from Oslo
People educated at Oslo Cathedral School
Norwegian expatriates in Hungary
Spouses of prime ministers of Norway
Ambassadors of Norway to Belgium
Stoltenberg family
Norwegian women ambassadors